Seal Islands are a pair of islands in Suisun Bay at the mouth of the Sacramento-San Joaquin River Delta in Contra Costa County, California, 10 km east of Benicia, and 500 metres off-shore from the former Concord Naval Weapons Station and Port Chicago Naval Magazine.

See also
 List of islands of California

References

Islands of Contra Costa County, California
Islands of the San Francisco Bay Area
Islands of the Sacramento–San Joaquin River Delta
Islands of Northern California
Islands of Suisun Bay